The siege of Sozopolis saw the Byzantine conquest of the Seljuq Turk-held town of Sozopolis in 1120, improving Byzantine communications with the city of Attaleia.

Background
After re-conquering the city of Laodicea from a Seljuq Turkish garrison of 700 men in 1119, the Byzantine emperor John II Komnenos continued his campaigns against the Turks in 1120 after a brief stay in Constantinople. The 1120 campaign target was the town of Sozopolis in Pisidia, which controlled the lines of communication to Attaleia.

Siege
Sozopolis was protected by an armed garrison and steep hills. A large-scale siege attack was thus impossible. The town could only be attacked by small forces. John was initially at a loss how to proceed but later came up with a plan. He ordered a force of missile-armed cavalry under Paktiarios and Dekanos to attack the town gates and shoot at the Turkish soldiers manning the walls. The Turks took the bait and poured out of the gate. The Byzantine force then executed a planned retreat, drawing the Turks far out beyond the town. The rest of the Byzantine army had lain hidden in the thick undergrowth and assaulted the undefended town after the Turks had passed them. The fleeing Byzantines turned about and faced the pursuing Turks. The Turks were trapped between the Byzantine cavalry to their front and the army to their back and were largely killed or captured, with a handful making it out of the encirclement.

Aftermath
Next, the fortress of Hierakokoryphitis capitulated to John without a fight, along with many other towns and fortifications near Attaleia, after which John returned to Constantinople.

Analysis
The combat at Sozopolis demonstrated the discipline of the Byzantine troops, who could feign flight without panicking. The Byzantine cavalry could fight effectively with both missile and close-combat weapons. John showed himself a competent general, carrying out a complex tactical maneuver at the very beginning of his reign.

Citations

References

Primary

Secondary

Sieges of the Byzantine–Seljuk wars
Conflicts in 1120
Sieges involving the Byzantine Empire
Sieges involving the Sultanate of Rum
1120 in Asia
1120s in the Byzantine Empire
John II Komnenos